Richard Kenneth Dell  (11 July 1920 – 6 March 2002) was a New Zealand malacologist.

Biography
Dell was born in Auckland in 1920. As a young boy, he took an interest in shells, collecting them from the shores of Waitematā Harbour. He even managed to start a "museum" in his backyard. He also helped curate the Auckland War Memorial Museum shell collection.

Dell studied at Mount Albert Grammar School and later at the Auckland University College. He took a teacher’s course at Auckland Teachers' College, but World War II delayed his plans to become a teacher. He joined the New Zealand Artillery, serving on Nissan Island, the Solomon Islands, Southwest Asia, Egypt, and Italy.  He later published several papers on the land snails he had collected in the Solomon Islands.

In 1946, he married botanist and schoolteacher Miriam Matthews, and they had four daughters together. His wife continued working after their marriage and became a well-known women's advocate.

After the war, Dell was offered a job as malacologist at the Dominion Museum, where he started to standardise the cabinets and built up a collection of more than 30,000 specimens. In the meantime, he took a master's degree in Science at Victoria University College, with a pioneering thesis on cephalopods, octopuses and squid.

His breakthrough came with the Chatham Islands Expedition of 1954. The results were published in 1956 as The Archibenthal Mollusca of New Zealand, which was a major contribution to the knowledge of molluscan fauna in the bathyal zone of New Zealand waters. This publication earned him a Doctorate in Science in 1956.

Soon after, Dell started to work on Antarctic collections, with among others Alan Beu and Winston Ponder. In 1964, he published a major monograph on the Antarctic bivalves, chitons and scaphopods.

Dell became first Assistant Director in 1961 and later in 1966, Director of the Dominion Museum, which would become the Museum of New Zealand Te Papa Tongarewa. He retired in 1980, and started writing again. In 1990, he published his standard work Antarctic Mollusca with special reference to the Fauna of the Ross Sea. Dell published more than 150 papers on Mollusca (marine, terrestrial and freshwater), crabs and birds. He also made a major contribution to the Antarctic biogeography.

Honours and awards
In the 1981 New Year Honours, Dell was appointed a Companion of the Queen's Service Order for public services. In 1977, he was awarded the Queen Elizabeth II Silver Jubilee Medal, and in 1990 he received the New Zealand 1990 Commemoration Medal. He was an honoured member of many scientific societies and committees. He won prizes and medals in New Zealand and abroad, including the Hamilton Prize in 1955, and the Hector Medal in 1965, both awarded by the Royal Society of New Zealand. He has named many new species of molluscs and several new crustaceans.

Death
Dell died in 2002, after a long illness, in Wellington. He was survived by his wife, Dame Miriam Dell, and their four daughters.

Selected publications
 In scientific journals 
 Dell, R.K. (1950) A Tertiary molluscan fauna from Waikowhai, Manukau Harbour, Auckland. Dominion Museum Records in Zoology, 1, 29–37.
 Dell, R.K. (1952) A revision of the molluscan fauna of the Hurupi beds, southern Wairarapa. Dominion Museum Records in Zoology, 1, 71–86.
 Dell, R.K. (1953) A molluscan fauna from the Chatham Rise, New Zealand. Dominion Museum Records in Zoology, 2, 37–50.
 Dell, R.K. (1955) Nature in New Zealand Native Shells. A.H. & A.W. Reed, Wellington, 64 pp.
 Dell, R.K. (1956) The archibenthal Mollusca of New Zealand. Dominion Museum Bulletin, 18, 1–235.
 Dell, R.K. (1956) Some new off-shore Mollusca from New Zealand. Dominion Museum Records in Zoology, 3, 27–59.
 Dell, R.K. (1962) Additional archibenthal Mollusca from New Zealand. Dominion Museum Records in Zoology, 4, 67–76.
 Dell, R.K. (1963) Notes on some New Zealand Mollusca in the British Museum. Transactions of the Royal Society of New Zealand, Zoology, 3, 171–177.
 Dell, R.K. (1963) Archibenthal Mollusca from northern New Zealand. Transactions of the Royal Society of New Zealand, Zoology, 3, 205–216.
 Dell, R.K. (1972) Notes on nomenclature of some Mollusca from Antarctica and southern South America. Records of the Dominion Museum, 8, 21–42.
 Dell, R.K. (1990) Antarctic Mollusca with special reference to the fauna of the Ross Sea. The Royal Society of New Zealand Bulletin, 27, 1–311.
 Other publications
 The New Zealand Cephalopoda (1952)
 The fresh-water Mollusca of New Zealand, 3 parts (1953–1956)
 The position of systematics in the biological sciences (1953)
 Cephalopoda (1959)
 Antarctic and Subantarctic Mollusca, Bivalvia, Amphineura and Scaphopoda (1964)

Taxa named by R.K. Dell
Apart from having named numerous species in the Mollusca and some in the Crustacea, he has also established a number of new genera :
 Alertalex Dell, 1956 (Calliostomatidae)
 Antarctodomus Dell, 1972 (Buccinidae)
 Benthomodiolus Dell, 1987 (Mytilidae )
 Cavellioropa Dell, 1952 (Charopidae)
 Chathamidia Dell, 1956 : synonym of Exilia Conrad, 1860 (Ptychatractidae)
 Falsitromina Dell, 1990 (Buccinidae)
 Flammoconcha Dell, 1952 (Charopidae)
 Maoriconcha Dell, 1952 (Charopidae)
 Maoricrater Dell, 1956 (Lepetidae)
 Maoriscaphander Dell, 1950 (Cylichnidae)
 Obanella Dell, 1952 (Charopidae)
 Pseudegestula Dell, 1954 (Charopidae)
 family Rhizoridae Dell, 1952 (superfamily Philinoidea) [originally regarded as a synonym of Retusidae by Bouchet & Rocroi (2005) but reinstated as valid by Malaquias et al. (2009) ]
 Rissopsetia Dell, 1956 (Pyramidellidae)
 Ruapukea Dell, 1952 (Aclididae)
 Tasmalira Dell, 1956 (Cerithiopsidae)
 Tasmocrossea Dell, 1952 (Skeneidae)
 Tecticrater Dell, 1956 (Lepetellidae)
 (Crustacea) Pteropeltarion Dell, 1972 (Trichopeltariidae)

Taxa named in honour of R.K. Dell
 The Sea Snail Brookula delli Numanami, 1996
 The Sa Snail Calliotropis delli Marshall, 1979
 Carditella delli Crozier, 1966
 Cuspidaria delli Knudsen, 1970
 Cyclochlamys delli Dijkstra & Marshall, 2008
 Cymonomus delli Griffin & Brown, 1975
 The fish Genus Dellichthys Briggs, 1955
 The Sea Snail Eatoniella delli Ponder, 1965
 Gasparia delli (Forster, 1955)
 Limatula delli Fleming, 1978
 Neilo delli B.A. Marshall, 1978
 Nereis delli Knox, 1960
 Nuculana delliana Huber, 2010
 Ogyrides delli Yaldwyn, 1971
 The Sea Snail Otukaia delli McLean & Andrade, 1982
 The Sea Snail Penion benthicolus delli Powell, 1971
 Platypodia delli Takeda & Webber, 2006
 Podocatactes delli (Guinot, 1989) (basionym: Trachycarcinus delli Guinot, 1989)
 The Sea Snail Tractolira delli Leal & Harasewych, 2005
 The Sea Snail Zeacolpus delli Marwick, 1957 : synonym of Stiracolpus pagoda (Reeve, 1849)

References

Sources
 Tucker, J.K. 2004 Catalog of recent and fossil turrids (Mollusca: Gastropoda). Zootaxa 682:1-1295

External links
 Biography and photo

1920 births
2002 deaths
New Zealand malacologists
20th-century New Zealand zoologists
Victoria University of Wellington alumni
People educated at Mount Albert Grammar School
People associated with the Museum of New Zealand Te Papa Tongarewa
Presidents of the Royal Society of New Zealand
Companions of the Queen's Service Order